Manjhaul (also pronounced as Majhaul or Majhauli) is a village in the Begusarai district of Bihar state in India. It is notable for the Jaimangla Garh temple and Kaber Lake (Birds Sanctuary).

Geography
It has an average elevation of 41 metres (134 feet). It has an area of 9.8 km2.

Climate
The climate of Manjhaul is a monsoon-influenced humid subtropical climate (Köppen Cwa) with high variation between summer and winter in terms of both temperature and rainfall. The temperature varies from 46 °C (115 °F) in summers to around 11 °C (32 °F) in winters. Summers are long, extending from early April to October, with the monsoon season occurring in the middle of the summer. Winter starts in November and peaks in January. The annual mean temperature is around 25 °C (77 °F); monthly daily mean temperatures range from approximately 09 to 34 °C (48 to 93 °F). The average annual rainfall is 1384mm of which 83% falls between Mid June and & Mid-October. Monsoon normally starts in June and lasts till October. The early monsoon currents, channelled to the NW are the principal source of rainfall of the region. 17% of pre monsoonal rains, which is spread in the different months of the year (specially in the months of November–December–January) have been explained as due to Norwester affect and rest during monsoons due to Himalayan affect. Heavy rains, supplemented by physiographic/geomorphic features lead to heavy flood.

Demographics
As reported by the Census of India 2011 Manjhaul village has population of 35,905 of which 19,021 are males while 16,884 are females. In Manjhaul village population of children with age 0-6 is 5,950 which makes up 17% of total population of town. Average Sex Ratio of Manjhaul village is 888 which is lower than Bihar state average of 918. Child Sex Ratio for the Majhaul as per census is 865, lower than Bihar average of 935. The literacy rate is 61.70%, with 68.39% male literacy and 54.20% female literacy.

Economy
The market in Manjhaul attracts people from more than 10 nearby villages for work and shopping.

Places of interest

Kanwar Lake Bird Sanctuary
Kanwar Lake Bird Sanctuary or Kabar Taal Lake is Asia's largest freshwater oxbow lake, formed due to meandering of Gandak river, a tributary of Ganga, in the geological past. About 60 migratory birds come from Central Asia in winter and there are around 106 species of resident birds. In 2020, it was declared as a Ramsar site.

Jaimangla Garh
Jaimangla Garh is located near Kabar Taal Lake, and it has a temple of goddess Chandi Mangla Devi.

Culture

Festivals
People of Manjhaul celebrate Chhath, Durga Puja, Holi, Diwali, Makar Sankranti, Eid al-Fitr, Muharram and many more festivals.

Transport

Railways
Begusarai railway station is the nearest railway station. It's 17 km  from Manjhaul.

Roadways
Manjhaul has a bus stand connecting it to big cities like Delhi, Patna, Lucknow, Ranchi, Kolkata.

Education
Manjhaul is home to a number of schools and colleges. R.C.S. College, Manjhaul is one of the oldest colleges of Begusarai District.

References

Villages in Begusarai district